Eugene Loh (1934–2006) was a Chinese-American physicist, having been Distinguished Professor Emeritus at University of Utah and was a Fellow of the American Physical Society.

Biography
Loh spent his childhood in Suzhou, China and emigrated to Virginia with his family at 14. He received his BS from Virginia Polytechnic Institute and his PhD from MIT. He took his first faculty job at Cornell University before moving to the University of Utah in 1975. He led the team to build the Fly's Eye detector at the US Army's Dugway Proving Ground, which in 1991 recorded the most energetic cosmic ray ever detected, known as the "Oh-My-God particle". He received the Utah Governor's Medal for Science and Technology in 1987. In 1998, Dr. Loh became rotating Program Director of Astrophysics at the National Science Foundation (NSF).

References

1944 births
2006 deaths
University of Utah faculty
20th-century American physicists
Fellows of the American Physical Society
Virginia Tech alumni
Massachusetts Institute of Technology alumni
Cornell University faculty
Cosmic ray physicists
Scientists from Suzhou